Goofy Groceries is a 1941 Warner Bros. Merrie Melodies animated short film directed by Bob Clampett. The short was released on March 29, 1941.

Bearing a similar premise to earlier WB shorts Speaking of the Weather and Have You Got Any Castles? but having a cast inspired by food products instead of magazines or books, the cartoon was written by Melvin Millar and produced by Leon Schlesinger. The animators included Vive Risto, Izzy Ellis, John Carey, Rod Scribner. and Cal Dalton.

Plot 
The cartoon takes place one winter night, in a grocery store whose owner has just closed the shop. The mascots on the labels of the food products come to life and perform various song and dance numbers.

First, a cow for "Contented Milk" sings to a "Fulla Bull Tobacco" bull "If I Could Be with You," while two other cows on cans reading "Discontented Milk" ogle and whistle at the bull. Meanwhile, a crab imitating Ned Sparks states "This love stuff makes me sick!", after which a rabbit named Jack Bunny (a parody of Jack Benny and also a same name from I Love to Singa) tells the music maestro (a dish mop caricaturing Leopold Stokowski) to start up, and a label for "Big Top Popcorn" comes to life while a dog barker for "Barker's Dog Food" addresses the crowd and introduces each of the circus's attractions including "Little Egypt Wiggly Gum," "Billy Posie's Aquackade" swimmers (a parody of Footlight Parade's "By a Waterfall"), and the "Tomato Can Can Dancers". Meanwhile, an "Animal Crackers" gorilla (intended to parody King Kong) hears the noise and starts growling, at one point stating to the audience, "Gosh, ain't I repulsive?" This gorilla stares at the female performers and smiles, he then begins his attack attempting to abduct one of the "Can Can Dancers"; Jack Bunny sees this and rides a bottle of "Horse Radish" while an army of "Navy Beans" and "Turtle Soup Turtles" shoots at the gorilla, who defends himself with a Roman candle while at one point destroying the bottle of Horse Radish that Jack is riding. Jack sees a box of "Chocolate-Covered A1 Cherries" and snatches the axe on the label amid cheering from an army of chicks, at which point the gorilla shoots the axe with the candle causing it to shrink. As Jack Bunny dons a sheepish grin and backs into a corner, the image resembling Superman on a box of "Superguy Soap Chips" comes to life at the sight of the gorilla lighting a stick of dynamite with Bunny's cigar. Superguy flies up to the gorilla and shouts at him, "Hey, you big ape!" and the gorilla replies "Yeah?" which scares Superguy so much that he turns into a helpless, whining baby. Then, as the gorilla is about to destroy Jack Bunny with the dynamite in his hand, a firm voice calls out "HENRY!!!" (in reference to the opening of The Aldrich Family), causing him to pause and run towards the direction of the voice, becoming meek and saying in a frightened voice "Coming, mother!" (another reference to the opening) while his apparent "mother" drags him away by his ear, harshly chastising him for his naughty behaviors as he pleads for mercy. Jack Bunny breathes a sigh of relief only to realize he's still holding the dynamite, which explodes leaving him in blackface. After being exploded on, he then concludes the cartoon with an Eddie Rochester impression: "My oh my, tattletale grey!"

Home media
The cartoon is available restored, uncut, and uncensored on Disc 2 of the 2005 DVD Looney Tunes Golden Collection: Volume 3. It was also released on The Golden Age Of Looney Tunes Volume 2 laserdisc.

References

External links 

1941 films
Merrie Melodies short films
Films directed by Bob Clampett
American musical comedy films
1941 animated films
1940s Warner Bros. animated short films